The 1900 Clemson Tigers football team represented Clemson Agricultural College—now known as Clemson University–during the 1900 Southern Intercollegiate Athletic Association football season. Under first year head coach John Heisman, the team posted a 6–0 record and Southern Intercollegiate Athletic Association (SIAA) championship.

The Tigers outscored their opponents 222–10; the 64–0 win over Davidson on opening day was then the largest score ever made in the South and the season's only home game. The only close game was with the  South Atlantic school VPI.

Before the season
Walter Riggs led the effort to raise the $415.11 to hire Auburn's football coach John Heisman, the first Clemson coach who had experience coaching at another school. As Riggs recalled, "By 1899 the Clemson football team had risen steadily until its material was equal to that of any southern college, and the time had come to put on the long-planned finishing touch." Heisman once described his style of play at Clemson as "radically different from anything on earth".

The team took the field in jerseys and stockings bearing distinctive orange and purple stripes. Norman Walker was team captain.

Schedule

Game summaries

Davidson
Clemson opened the season at home in Calhoun on October 19, winning over Davidson 64–0, then the largest score ever made in the South.

Wofford
The Tigers beat Wofford 21–0 on October 22. Clemson agreed that every point scored after the first four touchdowns would not count.

South Carolina
Going into the South Carolina game, Clemson had been strong on offense, but weak on defense. Kinsler and Douthit were both injured. The Tigers rolled up a 51–0 score on South Carolina.

Georgia

Before the game with Georgia, students in the dorms barraged Clemson players with bits of coal. Clemson went on to beat the Bulldogs for the first time, pulling away in the second half to overwhelm the Bulldogs 39–5, and achieve the season's first great victory.

The starting lineup was Bellows (left end), Dickerson (left tackle), George (left guard) Kinsley (center), Woodward (right guard), Walker (right tackle), Lynah (right end), Lewis (quarterback), Forsyth (left halfback), Hunt (right halfback), Douthit (fullback).

V. P. I.

In Charlotte, Clemson beat VPI 12–5 in the first-ever meeting between the two schools. The game was shortened due to darkness. Hunter Carpenter starred for VPI.

Alabama

The season closed on Thanksgiving against the Alabama Crimson White, Clemson's first meeting with Alabama, at Birmingham's North Birmingham Park. The Tigers won 35–0. Clemson back Claude Douthit scored four touchdowns.

After the Tigers forced an Alabama punt to open the game, Douthit scored three consecutive touchdowns for Clemson en route to an 18–0 lead. Douthit scored first on a 5-yard run, next on a short reception and finally on a second short touchdown run. M. N. Hunter then scored for Clemson on a long run just before the break and made the halftime score 23–0. In the second half, the Tigers extended their lead to 35–0 behind a long Jim Lynah touchdown run and Douthit's fourth score of the day on a short run. With approximately four minutes left in the game, both team captains agreed to end the game early due to an unruly crowd and impending darkness.

Postseason

The Tigers ended the season with the outright SIAA title.  It was both Clemson and Heisman's first conference championship and undefeated, untied season. The season saw "the rise of Clemson from a little school whose football teams had never been heard of before, to become a football machine of the very first power."

Players

Depth chart
The following chart provides a visual depiction of Clemson's lineup during the 1900 season. The chart mimics the offense in a T formation.

Line

Backfield

Substitutes

Notes

References

Books
 
 
 
 

Clemson
Clemson Tigers football seasons
College football undefeated seasons
Clemson Tigers football